Rachel Talalay (born July 16, 1958) is a British-American film and television director and producer. She is also a University of British Columbia film professor.

Early life and education
Talalay was born in Chicago, Illinois. Her father Paul Talalay was a pharmacologist, born in Berlin to a Russian Jewish family, and her mother Pamela is an English biochemist. She has two sisters and a brother. She was raised mostly in Baltimore, Maryland, with two years of her childhood in Britain. Talalay attended Yale, where she majored in mathematics, graduating in 1980. She also ran the Yale Film Society.

Career
Talalay worked in a number of different capacities in filmmaking before making her directorial debut with the film Freddy's Dead: The Final Nightmare (1991). Talalay also worked on the first four A Nightmare on Elm Street films. Her work with the earlier Nightmare films utilized her computer skills and finding ways to create better special effects while still keeping costs low. Despite her familiarity with the Freddy movies, when she directed Freddy's Dead, she was given internal memos telling her not to be "too girly" or "too sensitive."

Talalay also directed Tank Girl in 1995, and was looking into re-optioning the rights to make a new film in 2008. As a film producer, Talalay worked with director John Waters on the films Hairspray (1988) and Cry-Baby (1990). She was also a production assistant on Waters' 1981 film Polyester.

Talalay states that ever since Doctor Who was revived in 2005, she wanted to work on the show. Talalay directed all three of Peter Capaldi's series finales: series 8's "Dark Water" and "Death in Heaven", series 9's "Heaven Sent" and "Hell Bent"—the former considered by many to be one of the best episodes in the show's history— and series 10's "World Enough and Time" and "The Doctor Falls", as well as the Doctor Who 2017 Christmas special, "Twice Upon a Time". She returns to Doctor Who in 2023 for a special with David Tennant & Catherine Tate returning as the Fourteenth Doctor and Donna Noble as part of the show's 60th anniversary. In 2019, she directed a film adaption of Joe Ballarini's A Babysitter's Guide to Monster Hunting for Netflix.

Personal life
Talalay met British film producer Rupert Harvey while working on Android in 1982. They began a relationship soon after, and were married in 1990, with John Waters officiating the wedding.

Filmography

Films

Television
TV movies
 A Tale of Two Wives (2003)
 The Wind in the Willows (2006)
 Hannah's Law (2012)
 The Dorm (2014)
 Unclaimed (2016)

TV series

References

External links
 

1958 births
American film producers
American people of English descent
20th-century American Jews
American people of German-Jewish descent
American people of Russian-Jewish descent
American television directors
American television producers
American women film directors
American women film producers
American women television producers
Film directors from Illinois
Living people
Academic staff of the University of British Columbia
American women television directors
Yale University alumni
American women academics
21st-century American Jews
20th-century American women
21st-century American women